Bobby Lalonde is a Canadian musician originating from the Ottawa Valley (Eastern Ontario).

Family and early life
Lalonde was born on May 22, 1958. The youngest of four brothers (Gerry, Gilles, and Marc), he grew up surrounded by various musical influences. His parents, Beatrice Lalonde (Couture) and Gaston Lalonde, were both of French-Canadian heritage, and had strong ties to Ottawa-Valley country music. He attended the French Catholic elementary school in Saint-Isidore-de-Prescott and the École secondaire catholique de Plantagenet.

Lalonde began playing the fiddle at the age of eight, and soon the Lalonde family band "The Four Sons" was formed.  By the time Lalonde was thirteen, he was signed to a three-albums contract with London Records of Canada, had won the North American Junior Fiddle Championship, and was a much-in-demand musician for studio, television and live performances.

Music career
At the age of fifteen, Lalonde was featured with Stompin' Tom Connors in the 1973 movie Across this Land with Stompin' Tom Connors. He also played fiddle multiple times on the Quebec television series Le Ranch à Willie featuring Willie Lamothe.

In his late teens, Lalonde joined the award-winning rock group Garolou. He contributed to the albums Romancero (1980), and Garolou (1978), for which the band won Félix Awards for album of the year.

Soon after his time with Garolou, Lalonde fronted his own group, the Bobby Lalonde Band, which toured continuously from 1981 to 1997. The band played multiple venues across Canada and the United States, and also embarked on several tours through Holland, Belgium, Germany and Switzerland. Over the years, the band featured artists such as Alain Brisson, Roger Belisle, Normand Couture, Ted Gerro, Kelli Trottier, Peter Beaudoin, Dave Arthur, Gilles Godard, Sylvain Lavoie, Charlie Grassy, Jean Poulin, Eric Sauve, and Steve Piticco. With his band, Lalonde went on to win multiple Canadian Country Music Association awards, including "Instrumentalist of the Year" three times, "Back Up Band of the Year" twice, and "All Star Band - Special Instrument". The group also received numerous Canadian Country Music Association nominations between 1983 and 1993.

During this time Lalonde's song writing talents were also recognized, and he was honoured with two #1 records and several top ten hits. To date he has fourteen albums to his credit, and has performed with greats such as Tom Cochrane, Kenny Rogers, Ricky Skaggs, Waylon Jennings, Colleen Peterson, Joe Diffy, George Jones, Johnny Cash and many more.

Performances also include the Havelock Country Jamboree, Power Aid Live at the Ottawa's Corel Centre (now Canadian Tire Center), St. Tite Festival, Gatineau Clog, and Ottawa's National Art Center. In 1981, Lalonde received an invitation from Prime Minister Pierre Trudeau to perform at the 7th G7 summit in Montebello, Quebec with Liona Boyd and Diana Juster for eight world leaders.

Lalonde has also co-hosted his own TV show with Ronnie Prophet, titled Spirit of the Country, and has hosted many prestigious events including the Canada Day Festivities at Queen's Park in Toronto, as well as had numerous appearances on Canadian television variety shows.

In 1998 Lalonde joined Michel Bénac to create a new sound, urban folk music. Their new group, dubbed Swing, was a Canadian néo-trad band of Franco-Ontarian origins, which mixed Franco-Ontarian folklore with techno music. Michel and Lalonde wrote their first single on February 18, 1998, entitled "Ça va brasser". Swing's debut album and tour earned them four Trille-Or Awards from the Association des Professionnels de la Chanson et de la Musique.

On July 1, 2001, Swing performed on Parliament Hill for Canada Day, in front of 100,000 spectators. The performance was also broadcast on live television across Canada. This performance gave them a nomination at the Gemini Awards  (2002) in the category of Best Performance or Host in a Variety Program or Series.

When not performing, Lalonde was also an accomplished record producer and recording artist, often contributing to his clients' albums. His recording studio, Bolab Audio Productions, produced albums for many artists, including the Brigadoons, Ashley MacLeod, Trevor Baker, Michel Bénac, Paddy Kelly, The Glengarry Bhoys, Kelli Trottier, Rob Taylor, Brian Caddell, Northern Sons, Ronnie Prophet, Marie King, Carol Ann King, Gilles Godard, Brigadoons, Macleod Fiddlers, Manon Séguin, Arc En Son, Eric Michael Hawks, Gail Gavan, and the Glengarry Highland Games.

Lalonde has a long history of both playing for and hosting the CHEO telethon. Lalonde also contributed to Wayne Rostad's "Christmas in the Valley" album, in support of CHEO. His many years of volunteering for the telethon earned him a 2015 CHEO Order of the Good Bear award, which is the CHEO Foundation's tribute to community members for volunteer efforts and fundraising initiatives.

In October 2002, Lalonde stepped back from his lifelong career as a performing artist in order to focus on other ventures. Along with his wife and family, Lalonde opened Bobby Lalonde Music, a retail store and sound production company. Originally located in Vankleek Hill, Ontario, the store is now in Hawkesbury, Ontario.

Discography

{| class="wikitable"
|-
! style="width:5em;"|Release
! style="width:10em;"|Group
! style="width:10em;"|Album title
! style="width:16em;"|Track listing
! style="width:30em;"|Notes
|-
|1973
| Bobby Lalonde
| Volume 1
|
 First Century
 Maple Sugar
 Dragging the Bow
 Marion Waltz
 Grand-Pa's Brushout
 Dauphin Waltz
 Black Foot Jam
 Sweet Georgia Brown
 Louisiana Waltz
 Boil the Cabbage
 Eidleweiss
 Shelburne Reel
 Rippling Water Jig
|London Records SDS-5154
|-
| 1974
| Bobby Lalonde
| Volume 2
|
 Eddy's Reel
 Maytime Swing
 Autumn Waltz
 Walking Up Town
 Springhill Jig
 Pretty Priscille Waltz
 Johnny Mooring Special
 Gros Morne
 Carol Kennedy Waltz
 Big John McNeil
 Niomi's Jig
 Angus Campbell
|London Records SDS-5177
|-
|1976
| Bobby Lalonde
| Volume 3
|
 Blazing Sun
 Little Burnt Potato
 Clarinet Polka
 Ookpic Waltz
 Just Jazzin'
 Back Forty Rop-Off
 Foggy Mountain Breakdown
 The Ashton Rose
 Orange Blossom Special
 Yellow Bird
 Blue Sea
 Silver Wedding Reel
 Ice on the Road
|London Records SDS-5184
|-
| 1978
| Garolou
| Garolou
|
 Aux Illinois	
 La complainte du maréchal Biron	
 Le départ pour les États	
 Je me suis habillé en plumes	
 Alouette	
 Victoria	
 La retraite de Bonaparte	
 Wing-tra-la	
 Germaine
|London Records LFS-9027
 Félix Award winner - 1979 Best Folklore or Traditional Album 
 CAN: Gold Album Certification 
|-
| 1980
| Garolou
| Romancero
|
 Le mariage anglais - 5:34
 Sur le bout du pont - 3:30
 Damon et Henriette - 4:42
 Nicholas - 5:43
 Dr. Mason - 2:58
 Dans Paris - 3:55
 La danse de la limonade - 3:23
 Quand j'étais garçon - 2:33
 D'où reviens-tu, mon fils Jacques - 6:00
 Le condamné - 4:13
|London Records LFS-9032
 Félix Award winner - 1980 Best Folklore or Traditional Album 
|-
| 1980
| Various Artists
| Christmas in the Valley
|
 Christmas in the Valley - Wayne Rostad
 Scarlet Ribbons - Neville Wells
 Silver Bells - Terry Carisse
 Beautiful Star of Bethlehem - Family Brown
 Pretty Paper - Rick Thompson
 I Believe in Santa Claus - Wayne Rostad & The Forest Ridge Gang
 One Bright Star - Bruce Golden
 The Heart of Christmas is a Child - Dave Jeffrey, Robin Moir & Craig Kennedy
 If Every Day Was Like Christmas - Bobby Lalonde
 Thank God for Kids - Wayne Rostad
| Stag Creek Records WRC1-4879
|-
| 
| Bobby Lalonde Band
| Forty Shades of Blue
|
 Forty Shades of Blue
 Play Old Man
 Rosin Up
 Breezy Nights
 Just Kidding
 Lisa
 Jamie
 This Dream
 Midnight Ride
 Diggy Diggy Li
| Bolab Records CRI-8136
|-
| 
| Bobby Lalonde
| Long Lonely Nights
|
 Let's Do It Again
 She Got Away With Love
 Lovers Will
 Long Lonely Nights
 Fool In Love
 If Your Love Ran Out Tomorrow
 Thanks To You
 Best of Love
 Hold Me To It
 Burning Out Of Control
| Bookshop Records International LTD BSR-33-770
|-
| 
| Bobby Lalonde Band
| Fiddle Man
|
 Zydeco
 Fiddleman
 Somedays
 Road to the Blues
 Be My Wife
 Cutting the Strings
 Somebody Painted My Hometown
 Fiddle Medley (Live)
 I Can't Get Close Enough
 Gospel Medley
| 
|-
| 
| Bobby Lalonde Band
| Shadow Knows
|
 Writing On The Wall
 Heart To The Wall
 Shadow Knows
 Count On Me
 Cajun Girl
 Could I Be Excused
 Blue Eyes
 Reinvented Love
 Sands Of Time
 Cajun Love Bug
| 
|-
| 
| Bobby Lalonde Band
| BLB Live
|
 Eagles Medley
 New Country
 Blue Rose Is
 Limonade
 Macarena
 Country Roads
 Blue Bayou
 Gospel Medley
 Banjy Minuett
 The Devil...
|
|-
| 
| Bobby Lalonde
| Violina'''
|
 Le Reel De Fournier
 Jig Medley
 Violina
 Clog, Jig & Reels
 Jazz Medley
 Kelita's Jig
 Bubba's Rag
 Mooring's Farewell
 Wild Fiddler's Rag
 Danny Boy
|  
|-
| 
| Bobby Lalonde
| Classiques de Noel|
 Winter Wonderland
 O Holy Night
 Let It Snow
 White Christmas
 Santa Claus Is Coming To Town
 Silver Bells
 The Christmas Song
 Jingle Bell Rock
 Falling Snow
 Silent Night
|  
|-
| 1999
| Swing
| La Chanson Sacrée| 
 Ça Va Brasser
 Tien-Toé Ben
 Sur Le Bord Du St-Laurent
 Un Bon Matin
 Pour La Vie
 Vasectomie D’La Vie
 La Chanson Sacrée
 Au Champ Des Rêves
 Héo
 Sortie 51
|Tox Records 2001 Best New Single - "Un bon matin" -  Trille Or - Association des Professionnels de la Chanson et de la Musique
 2001 Best Producer - Bobby Lalonde - Trille Or - Association des Professionnels de la Chanson et de la Musique
|}

Awards and recognition
 2015 CHEO Order of the Good Bear recipient (CHEO Foundation's tribute to community members for volunteer efforts and fundraising initiatives)
 2013 Honorary President Jeux Franco-ontariens
 2003 Inductee, Ottawa Valley Country Music Hall of Fame
 2003 Recognition Award The Musicians' Association of Ottawa-Hull (now Musicians' Association of Ottawa-Gatineau)
 2003 Country Album of the Year - "Simple Man" by Trevor Baker - Producer Bobby Lalonde - GMA Canada Covenant Awards
 2003 Traditional Gospel Song of the Year - "O Canada" by Trevor Baker - Producer Bobby Lalonde - GMA Canada Covenant Awards
 2001 Best New Single - "Un bon matin" - Swing, Trille Or - Association des Professionnels de la Chanson et de la Musique
 2001 Best New Group - Swing, Trille Or - Association des Professionnels de la Chanson et de la Musique
 2001 Best Live Performance - Swing, Trille Or - Association des Professionnels de la Chanson et de la Musique
 2001 Best Producer - Swing - Bobby Lalonde, Trille Or - Association des Professionnels de la Chanson et de la Musique
 1990 All Star Band - Special Instrument - Bobby Lalonde (Fiddle - Bobby Lalonde), Canadian Country Music Association
 1987 Back-Up Band Of The Year - Bobby Lalonde Band, Canadian Country Music Association
 1987 Instrumentalist of the Year - Bobby Lalonde, Canadian Country Music Association
 1986 Back-Up Band Of The Year - Bobby Lalonde Band, Canadian Country Music Association
 1986 Instrumentalist of the Year - Bobby Lalonde, Canadian Country Music Association
 1984 Instrumentalist of the Year - Bobby Lalonde, Canadian Country Music Association
 1980 Best Folklore or Traditional Album - Garolou for album Romancero - Félix Award ADISQ
 1979 Best Folklore or Traditional Album - Garolou for album Garolou - Félix Award ADISQ 
 1979 Gold Album Certification - Garolou for album Garolou''  
 1974 Canadian Junior Fiddle Champion

Nominations
 2002 Best Performance or Host in a Variety Program or Series - Swing - Bobby Lalonde - The Thrill on the Hill: Canada Day 2001 - Gemini Awards
 1993 All Star Band - Fiddle - Bobby Lalonde Band (Bobby Lalonde), Canadian Country Music Association
 1992 All Star Band - Fiddle - Bobby Lalonde Band (Bobby Lalonde), Canadian Country Music Association
 1992 Back-Up Band Of The Year - Bobby Lalonde Band, Canadian Country Music Association
 1991 All Star Band - Fiddle - Bobby Lalonde Band (Bobby Lalonde), Canadian Country Music Association
 1991 Back-Up Band Of The Year - The Bobby Lalonde Band, Canadian Country Music Association
 1991 Instrumentalist of the Year - Bobby Lalonde, Canadian Country Music Association
 1990 Back-Up Band Of The Year - The Bobby Lalonde Band, Canadian Country Music Association
 1990 Instrumentalist of the Year - Bobby Lalonde, Canadian Country Music Association
 1989 Back-Up Band Of The Year - Bobby Lalonde Band, Canadian Country Music Association
 1989 Group or Duo of the Year - The Bobby Lalonde Band, Canadian Country Music Association
 1989 Instrumentalist of the Year - Bobby Lalonde, Canadian Country Music Association
 1988 Back-Up Band Of The Year - Bobby Lalonde Band, Canadian Country Music Association
 1988 Instrumentalist of the Year - Bobby Lalonde, Canadian Country Music Association
 1987 Songwriters' of the Year - Gilles Godard / Bobby Lalonde - No Holiday In LA (Ronnie Prophet), Canadian Country Music Association
 1986 Group or Duo of the Year - The Bobby Lalonde Band, Canadian Country Music Association
 1985 Group or Duo of the Year - The Bobby Lalonde Band, Canadian Country Music Association
 1985 Instrumentalist of the Year - Bobby Lalonde, Canadian Country Music Association
 1984 Group or Duo of the Year - Bobby Lalonde Band, Canadian Country Music Association
 1983 Group or Duo of the Year - Bobby Lalonde Band, Canadian Country Music Association
 1980 Group of the Year - Garolou - Félix Award ADISQ
 1979 Group of the Year - Garolou]- Félix Award ADISQ

References

Living people
1958 births